Maria Sanchez and Taylor Townsend were the defending champions, but Townsend decided not to participate this year. 

Sanchez partnered with Sharon Fichman and successfully defended her title, defeating Kristie Ahn and Fanny Stollár 6–2, 6–7(6–8), [10–6] in the final.

Seeds

Draw

References
Main Draw

Tevlin Women's Challenger
Tevlin Women's Challenger